Paul Andrew Dixon (born 22 November 1986) is a Scottish professional footballer who plays as a defender for Peterhead. Dixon has previously played for Dundee, Dundee United (twice), Huddersfield Town, Grimsby Town and Falkirk. He played three times for the Scotland national football team, all in 2012.

Club career

Monifieth Athletic
Born in Aberdeen, Dixon played youth football for Monifieth Athletic. At the age of 12, he joined the youth teams of Dundee.

Dundee
Dixon made his debut in July 2005, in a Scottish Challenge Cup match, making his league debut a week later. His first goal came in January 2006, when he netted the second in a 3–0 win at Brechin City and he scored again in the final match of the season, playing in the majority of first team games. Shortly after his first goal, Dixon was rewarded with a contract extension until the summer of 2008, along with eight other youngsters. In the 2006–07 season, Dixon continued as a first team regular, receiving his first sending off in March 2007 in a season where he failed to score. In his third season as a professional, Dixon again continued in the Dundee first team, although again failed to add to the goals scored in his first season.

In June 2007, Dixon was the subject of a failed move by Norwich City, who had Jim Duffy – the then-Dundee manager who gave Dixon his début – as assistant manager. Seven months later, Kilmarnock were also rebuffed and after Dixon stated his intention to leave Dens Park at the end of his contract.

Dundee United

2008–09 season
City rivals Dundee United emerged as favourites to sign him. On 23 June 2008, Dixon was unveiled as a Dundee United player. Dixon made his debut in late September in the League Cup win over Airdrie United and made his first league appearance four days later in the victory over Hearts. In Dixon's first six matches for United, the club conceded just once – an own goal by fellow defender Lee Wilkie. He scored his first goal for the club, a curling free-kick, against Celtic during a 2–2 draw on 3 January 2009. Such was his progress in his first season at Tannadice that he won the Fans' Young Player of the Year award.

2009–10 season
Dixon was again a regular in the Dundee United side during the 2009–10 season his second with the club making his first start of the season in the sides 2–0 home win over Hearts on the opening weekend, 17 August 2009. His good form over the first half of the season earned the left back a contract extension on 4 March 2010, when Dixon extended his contract with United until June 2012. He received a red card in his side's 3–0 home victory over Motherwell on 27 March 2010 and so received a three match ban for a reckless challenge on Motherwell player Jim O'Brien. Dixon made a total of 30 appearances all starts during the 2009–10 season including 25 in the league.

2011–12 season
Dixon made 36 league appearances during the 2011–12 season making his first appearances in the Europa League 1–0 away loss at Polish side Śląsk Wrocław 14 July 2011, he also pick up a yellow card in the home fixture on 21 July 2011 as Dundee United won 3–2 but were eliminated on away goals. His first league start of the season came in the sides opening day 1–1 draw at home to Kilmarnock on 24 July 2011, His first goal of the season came in his sides 4–1 away victory over Dunfermline Athletic on 29 October 2011 with the opener on 13 minutes, he then scored two goals passed Kilmarnock in two different games the first being his in Dundee's 1–1 draw in the side's second 1–1 away draw at Rugby Park on 17 December 2011 with a 90th-minute equaliser. Then, a 58th-minute strike to make it 2–0 in a Dundee United 4–0 home win over the side on 21 February 2012. He helped United finish fourth in the Scottish Premier League during the 2011–12 season, Dixon left Dundee at the end of his contract in June 2012 to sign for English side Huddersfield Town in the Football League Championship after making 142 appearances for United scoring five goals in the process.

Huddersfield Town
Dixon signed a three-year contract with newly promoted Football League Championship side Huddersfield Town in June 2012, becoming the club's second signing of the 2012–13 season after a capture of Republic of Ireland star Sean Scannell on 22 June just a few days earlier. Dixon was given the number 3 shirt by manager Simon Grayson on 12 July 2012 when the squad returned to training for the 2012–13 season. Dixon made his Huddersfield début in the League Cup first round 2–0 away defeat at Preston North End on 13 August 2012, playing the full 90 minutes of the tie. He made his league début in the 1–0 defeat by Cardiff City at the Cardiff City Stadium on 17 August.

During the 2014–15 season, he lost his regular left back position to Jack Robinson. After two and a half years at the Terriers, Dixon had his contract terminated by mutual consent on 2 February 2015. Following interest from another club, revealed to be his former club, Dundee United.

Dundee United
Having left Huddersfield, Dixon signed for Dundee United for a second time, on 2 February 2015, agreeing a contract until the end of the 2016–17 season. He made his second debut for the club on 14 February 2015, in a 3–2 defeat away to Kilmarnock.

Grimsby Town
On 12 July 2017 he joined Grimsby Town on trial. Manager Russell Slade gestured that he would be interested in signing Dixon after impressing in friendly victories over Scunthorpe United and Barnsley. On 28 July 2017, Dixon signed a two-year contract with the club. Dixon found his appearances limited under Michael Jolley, he left the club by mutual consent on 19 November 2018, after making six appearances in the 2018–19 season.

Falkirk
Dixon signed a short-term contract with Scottish Championship club Falkirk in December 2018, due to run until the end of the 2018–19 season.

Peterhead 
On 11 June 2022, Dixon joined Scottish League One side Peterhead.

International career

Scotland U21
Dixon is a Scottish international having represented his country at Under-21 level and receiving call ups to both the senior and B sides.
Dixon made his Scotland under-21 debut in August 2007, playing 82 minutes in a friendly match against the Czech Republic under-21 team. In May 2009, Dixon missed out on a Scotland B call-up due to a clash with United's league fixture.

Scotland
Dixon was selected in the full Scotland squad for a friendly against the Czech Republic in March 2010, along with United teammates Andy Webster and Garry Kenneth. Dixon made his full Scotland debut on 8 September 2012, in a goalless draw with Serbia in Scotland's opening World Cup qualifier of Group A at Hampden Park, playing the full 90 minutes and earning man of the match for his solid performance in defence.

Club statistics

Honours
Dundee United
 Scottish Challenge Cup: 2016–17

References

External links
Paul Dixon profile at the Grimsby Town F.C. website
Paul Dixon profile at the Dundee United F.C. website

Living people
1986 births
Footballers from Aberdeen
Scottish footballers
Scotland international footballers
Scotland under-21 international footballers
Association football fullbacks
English Football League players
Scottish Premier League players
Scottish Football League players
Scottish Professional Football League players
Dundee F.C. players
Dundee United F.C. players
Huddersfield Town A.F.C. players
Grimsby Town F.C. players
Falkirk F.C. players
Peterhead F.C. players